Juan Cerón was a Spanish Conquistador and the second and fourth governor (1509–1513) of Puerto Rico when the island was still called San Juan.  He was born in Écija, Spain.

Biography
Cerón's legacy in the history of the island is tainted by the rivalries between Nicolas de Ovando and Christopher Columbus' son, Diego Colón. When Colón retook possession of his father's title of "Admiral of the Seas" and the governorship of Hispaniola in 1509, he dispatched Cerón to Puerto Rico with the title of Alcalde Mayor to replace Ovando's favorite, Juan Ponce de León.  Ponce de León had just begun the conquest of Puerto Rico the previous year, and his replacement produced much dissension among the few settlers.  Ovando advocated for Ponce de León in Madrid, and the Crown conferred on him the title of Captain General and Governor of San Juan Bautista.  In 1511, however, under pressure by Colón, Cerón was posted as governor and Ponce de León left for his first adventure in Florida.

Cerón's governorship did not end well; complaints about his handling of the Repartimiento of Indians prompted the Crown to remove him and reinstall Ponce de León as governor in 1513.

References

Governors of Puerto Rico
Spanish Empire
16th-century Spanish people